Kyle Edward Kulinski (born January 31, 1988) is an American political commentator and media host. Kulinski is the host and producer of The Kyle Kulinski Show on his YouTube channel Secular Talk and is a co-host with his partner Krystal Ball on the progressive podcast Krystal Kyle & Friends.

A self-described left-wing populist and social democrat, Kulinski is a co-founder of Justice Democrats, a progressive political action committee whose candidates refuse donations from corporate PACs.

Early life
Kulinski was born on January 31, 1988, to a family of Polish and Italian descent. He was born and raised in the New York City suburbs of Westchester County, New York. He graduated from New Rochelle High School in 2006 and Iona College in 2010 with a bachelor's degree in political science and a minor in psychology.

Kulinski credits his father's premature death due to inadequate healthcare, the 2003 invasion of Iraq in his teenage years, and studying the works of Noam Chomsky as helping to shape his political views.

Career

The Kyle Kulinski Show
Kulinski started a YouTube channel in spring 2008, named "Secular Talk", while studying as a political science student. Kyle indicated from the beginning that the show leans heavily to the left. He presents the news with a "brash" and "in-your-face" tone along with jokes and swear words, in sharp contrast to the professional presentation style found in mainstream news outlets.

Disillusioned with US President Barack Obama by the end of his first term, Kulinski began publishing videos full-time, and started broadcasting on BlogTalkRadio as The Kyle Kulinski Show. This surge in activity pushed his YouTube subscriber count above 100,000. By 2015, Kulinski was making a living from Secular Talk. Since then, his videos regularly get hundreds of thousands of views. On December 16, 2022, the channel crossed 1 billion views on YouTube.

Justice Democrats

In December 2016, after the 2016 United States presidential election, Kulinski—alongside Cenk Uygur  of The Young Turks, and Saikat Chakrabarti and Zack Exley of the 2016 Bernie Sanders presidential campaign—created Justice Democrats, a political action committee with the goal of supporting progressive candidates in primary elections against Democratic members of congress. Uygur and Kulinski resigned from the group in late 2017. Since leaving, Kulinski has expressed disapproval with the Justice Democrats' political strategy, and has criticized congresspeople aligned with the Justice Democrats for not withholding their votes from House Speaker Nancy Pelosi in exchange for a House vote on Medicare for All.

Krystal Kyle & Friends

In January 2021, Kulinski and Krystal Ball started a podcast titled Krystal Kyle & Friends, where they are both co-hosts. Notable podcast guests have included Russell Brand, Noam Chomsky, Thomas Frank, Glenn Greenwald, Carl Hart, Justin Jackson, Bernie Sanders, Matt Taibbi, Nina Turner, Cornel West, Marianne Williamson, Richard D. Wolff, Jordan Peterson, Vaush, and Andrew Yang.

Political views 

Kulinski is cited as a progressive commentator. Kulinski has been noted by The Hill for his commentary regarding various presidential candidates, including Bernie Sanders, Joe Biden and Hillary Clinton. In Bridgewater State University's journal The Graduate Review, Kulinski has been described as one of the "new organic intellectuals of YouTube."

He has described himself as a social democrat, agnostic atheist, secular humanist, left-wing populist, and a left-libertarian. He characterizes his beliefs as moderate by international political standards, arguing that he is only considered far-left and extreme in the United States because "the spectrum of public discourse has shifted to the far-right". Kulinski advocates for single-payer healthcare, free tuition at public colleges and universities, a federal living wage, reduction in military spending, military non-interventionism, abolition of capital punishment, infrastructure spending, the legalization of euthanasia, and the legalization, regulation, and taxation of drugs and prostitution.

Kulinski opposes the use of biometrics for the purpose of employee management, characterizing this use as "rank authoritarianism disguised as corporate efficiency for consumer satisfaction."

Campaign finance 
Kulinski believes that campaign finance policy is what distinguishes progressive candidates from the mainstream of the Democratic Party, which he referred to as "just Republican-lite." When advocating for candidates endorsed by Justice Democrats, Kulinski stated "if somebody gives you a check for a tremendous amount of money, you’re going to look out for them. The Democratic Party is a shell of its former self. Get rid of the corporate money. We need to focus on the issues."

Electoral politics 
Kulinski supported Bernie Sanders in the 2016 Democratic primary election, and later voted for Jill Stein. While critical of Hillary Clinton, he described her as the "lesser of two evils" in the general election against Donald Trump and said that people in swing states should vote for Clinton to stop Trump from winning.

After Trump's election, Kulinski expressed his belief that progressives and liberals could successfully lobby President Trump to pursue policies such as infrastructure spending and economic protectionism. Kulinski criticizes the Never Trump movement and discourages praising Republicans who criticize Trump, stating "establishment Republicans want Trump to do every single thing he’s doing, minus the mean tweets."

After then-candidate Joe Biden became the presumptive winner of the 2020 Democratic Party presidential primaries, Kulinski stated that he would not support Biden, even if it meant Donald Trump winning. When commenting on this position, Kulinski mentioned that he encourages his critics to "blame him" if Trump were to win re-election, as he believed this would have demonstrated that candidates such as Biden require the support of progressives in order to win. Journalist Mehdi Hasan criticized Kulinski for this view, stating: "If you’re ok with a white nationalist winning a second term, I question your 'left-wing' credentials." Television host Joy Reid concurred with Hasan's criticism of Kulinski's position.

In March 2023, Kulinski attended Marianne Williamson's 2024 presidential campaign launch event at Union Station in Washington, D.C.

Social issues 
In 2014, when then-Fox News host Oliver North made a speech comparing fighting against gay rights to fighting against slavery, Kulinski covered the speech by saying: "Not only is there no comparison, if anything the opposition position on those issues is more like opposing slavery." Kulinski added: "To be in favor of gay rights and to try to treat people equally under the law—that is definitely a movement that is more in line with the idea behind the abolitionists of treating people equal and treating people right."

Kulinski has criticized religiously motivated opposition to abortion, arguing that, according to his interpretation of the Bible, abortion is permissible in Christianity.

Social media 
Kulinski is an advocate of free speech on social media platforms such as Twitter and YouTube. He opposes limiting the reach of YouTube channels or de-platforming, arguing that freedom of speech should apply to everyone. He believes that, due to the pressure of advertisers, his own channel is being suppressed by the YouTube algorithm.

Kulinski expressed support for the journalists involved with the Twitter Files, and believes their revelations should be covered more by the news media.

Personal life
Kulinski became engaged to fellow political commentator Krystal Ball in September 2022.

References

External links 

Secular Talk on BlogTalkRadio
Krystal Kyle & Friends podcast on Substack

1988 births
21st-century American journalists
21st-century atheists
Activists from New Rochelle, New York
American agnostics
American anti-war activists
American atheists
American humanists
American male journalists
American media critics
American online journalists
American libertarians
American people of Italian descent
American people of Polish descent
American podcasters
American political journalists
American political commentators
American radio DJs
American radio producers
American opinion journalists
American religious skeptics
American secularists
American social commentators
American social democrats
American talk radio hosts
American web producers
American YouTubers
Critics of creationism
Critics of religions
Free speech activists
Iona University alumni
Journalists from New York (state)
Left-libertarians
Left-wing populism in the United States
Living people
Non-interventionism
Progressivism in the United States
Secular humanists
The Young Turks people
YouTube critics and reviewers
New Rochelle High School alumni